Entreviñas (variant: San Cristóbal de Entreviñas) is one of 54 parishes in Cangas del Narcea, a municipality within the province and autonomous community of Asturias in northern Spain.

Villages
 Borracán
 La Braña San Cristuébalu
 Las Esculinas
 Rañeces de San Cristuébalu
 Robléu de San Cristuébalu
 Rucabu
 Veigalapiedra
 Briximada
 Viḷḷanueva

References

Parishes in Cangas del Narcea